Forest Park was an at-grade station on the Chicago Transit Authority's 'L' system, serving as the former western terminus of the Lake Street Elevated.

History 

The station was opened in 1910 as part of an extension of the Lake Street "L" into the Chicago & North Western Railroad's Forest Park yard. The adjacent Marion station had served as the terminal of the line since 1901. Passenger service was initially operated with a single track, but was expanded to two tracks by 1946. In 1962, the at-grade stations of the Lake Street "L" were moved onto the abandoned C&NW embankment, as the local stations had been abandoned since 1958. The elevation prompted the merger of the Forest Park station and the adjacent Marion station into the current Harlem/Lake station.

References

External links 

 Forest Park Station Page

Defunct Chicago "L" stations
Railway stations in the United States opened in 1910
Railway stations in Chicago
1910 establishments in Illinois
1962 disestablishments in Illinois